The  is a railway line operated by West Japan Railway Company (JR West) connecting Osaka and Fukuchiyama, Japan. Within JR West's "Urban Network" covering the Osaka–Kobe–Kyoto metropolitan region, the line from Osaka to Sasayamaguchi is also called the JR Takarazuka Line. The line traverses the cities of Kawanishi and Takarazuka in the northwestern corner of the Osaka metropolitan area.

Although Amagasaki is the line's official southeastern terminus, all trains continue east to Osaka and beyond on the JR Kōbe Line, or to the Gakkentoshi Line via the JR Tōzai Line.

Basic data

Operators, distances: 106.5 km / 66.2 mi.
West Japan Railway Company (Category-1, Services and tracks)
Track:
Double-track line:
From Amagasaki to Sasayamaguchi
Single-track line:
From Sasayamaguchi to Fukuchiyama
Railway signalling: Automatic
Maximum speed:
From Amagasaki to Shin-Sanda: 120 km/h
From Shinsanda to Fukuchiyama: 105 km/h
CTC centers:
From Amagasaki to Shin-Sanda: Ōsaka Operation Control Center
From Shinsanda to Fukuchiyama: Fukuchiyama Transportation Control Room
CTC system:
From Amagasaki to Shin-Sanda: JR Takarazuka-JR Tozai-Gakkentoshisen traffic control system

Services and stations 
 ● : All trains stop
 ▲ : Only local through trains to and from the JR Kyoto Line stop at Tsukamoto Station.
 △ : Only rapid and regional rapid through trains to and from the JR Tozai Line return at Tsukaguchi Station in the non-rush hour.
 | : All trains pass

Local (普通): Stops at all stations, a majority of them operate through services to the JR Kyoto Line, but only these trains stop at Tsukamoto Station. The remaining services operate solely within this line.

Rapid (快速): Mainly operates between Osaka and Sasayamaguchi. Some trains operate through services to/from the JR Tozai Line via Amagasaki Station. Among these through trains, some return at Tsukaguchi Station in the non-rush hour.

Tambaji Rapid (丹波路快速): Operates between Osaka and Fukuchiyama.

Regional Rapid (区間快速): Operates between Osaka and Sasayamaguchi or between Osaka and Shin-Sanda. Also through services to/from the JR Tozai Line and the Gakkentoshi Line.

Rolling stock

Current 
 207 series (Rapid and Local services, through service with Tōkaidō Main Line and Katamachi Line via JR Tōzai Line)
 223-5500 series (Local and wanman services)
 223-6000 series (Tanbaji and Rapid services)
 225-6000 series (Tanbaji and Rapid services)
 321 series (Rapid and Local services, through service with Tōkaidō Main Line and Katamachi Line via JR Tōzai Line)
 287 series (Kounotori limited express)
 289 series (Kounotori limited express, from 31 October 2015)

Former 
 103 series (until November 2005)
 113 series (until March 2012)
 115 series (until 2004)
 117 series (until April 2005)
 201 series (until March 2007)
 205 series (until February 2006)
 221 series (until March 2012)
 415 series (Temporary)
 183 series (Kounotori limited express, until 15 March 2013)
 381 series (Kounotori limited express, until May 2011, from June 2012, until 30 October 2015)
 KiHa 58 series
 KiHa 65 series
 KiHa 47 series
 KiHa 80 series (Matsukaze limited express)
 KiHa 181 series (Matsukaze limited express)
 Kitakinki Tango Railway KTR 001 series (Tango Explorer limited express, until March 2011)
 Kitakinki Tango Railway KTR 8000 series (Tango Explorer limited express, until March 2007)

History 

The Japanese Government Railways (JGR) opened the Osaka – Kobe section of what is now the Tokaido Main Line in 1874 as a dual track line.

The  opened a 762mm gauge line between Amagasaki and Itami (about 8 km) in 1891.

The Hankaku Railway converted the line to 1067mm gauge and extended it to Takarazuka in 1897 and to Fukuchiyama in 1899. The company also connected the line to the Kanzaki Station (present-day Amagasaki Station) of the JGR line in 1898 making the line to the original Amagasaki terminal a branch. Hankaku Railway was nationalized on August 1, 1907.

The Amagasaki – Tsukaguchi section was duplicated in 1934, and extended to Takarazuka in 1979/80. The Takarazuka – Shin-Sanda section was duplicated in 1986 in conjunction with the opening of the 2970m Najio tunnel and associated deviation, which shortened the route by 1.8 km. Duplication to Sasayamaguchi was completed in 1996.

The Amagasaki – Tsukaguchi section was electrified in 1956, and extended to Takarazuka in 1981. The remainder of the line was electrified in 1986.

CTC signalling was commissioned between Fukuchiyama and Sasayamaguchi in 1982, extended to Hirono in 1984 and to Amagasaki in 1986.

The branchline between Amagasakikō Station (former Amagasaki terminal of the horsecar railway) and Tsukaguchi Station ceased passenger operation in 1981 and freight operation in 1984.

Former connecting lines
 Sanda station – The Arima Line, a 12 km line to Arima operated from 1915 to 1943.
 Sasayama-guchi station –  The Sasayama Railway, a  5 km line to Sasayama-Chō opened in 1915. The private railway was discontinued in 1944 when the Sasayama Line of the Japanese Government Railways opened. The Sasayama Line closed in 1972.
 Fukuchiyama station – The Hokutan Railway Co. operated a 12 km line to Koumori between 1923 and 1971.

Accidents

On April 25, 2005, a seven-car 207 series train on a Rapid service derailed and crashed into a building between Tsukaguchi and Amagasaki on its way for Doshisha-mae via the JR Tōzai Line and the Katamachi Line. 107 passengers were killed in the accident. Operations on the affected part of the line remained suspended until trial runs began on June 7, 2005. Passenger service resumed on June 19, 2005.

It was a seven-car 207 series electric multiple unit (EMU) formation consisting of a 4-car set and a 3-car set coupled together. The train was carrying approximately 580 passengers at the time of the accident.

References

Rail transport in Osaka Prefecture
Rail transport in Hyōgo Prefecture
Rail transport in Kyoto Prefecture
Lines of West Japan Railway Company
Railway lines opened in 1891
1067 mm gauge railways in Japan